{{DISPLAYTITLE:C9H18O}}
The molecular formula C9H18O (molar mass: 142.24 g/mol) may refer to:

 Nonanal
 Nonanones
 2-Nonanone
 3-Nonanone
 4-Nonanone
 5-Nonanone, or dibutyl ketone
 3,3,5-Trimethylcyclohexanol